Acacia koa or commonly known as koa is a species of flowering tree in the family Fabaceae. It is endemic to the Hawaiian Islands, where it is the second most common tree. The highest populations are on Hawaii, Maui and Oahu.

Name
The name koa in the Hawaiian language ultimately comes from Proto-Austronesian *teRas meaning "core" or "ironwood"; many names referring to certain ironwood or heartwood species in Southeast Asia and Oceania such as Vitex parviflora (tugás in Cebuano), Eusideroxylon zwageri (togas in Tombonuwo), and Intsia bijuga (dort in Palauan) descend from this root.

Koa also means brave, bold, fearless, or warrior.

Description

It is one of the fastest-growing Hawaiian trees, capable of reaching  in five years on a good site.

Leaves
Initially, bipinnately compound leaves with 12–24 pairs of leaflets grow on the koa plant, much like other members of the pea family. At about 6–9 months of age, however, thick sickle-shaped "leaves" that are not compound begin to grow. These are phyllodes, blades that develop as an expansion of the leaf petiole. The vertically flattened orientation of the phyllodes allows sunlight to pass to lower levels of the tree.

Flowers
Flowering may be seasonal or year round depending on the location.

Fruit
Fruit production occurs when a koa tree is between 5 and 30 years old. Each pod contains an average of 12 seeds. The pods are mature and ready for propagation after turning from green to brown or black. Seeds are covered with a hard seed coat, and this allows them to remain dormant for up to 25 years. Scarification is needed before A. koa seeds will germinate.

Habitat
It requires  of annual rainfall. Acidic to neutral soils (pH of 4–7.4) that are either an Inceptisol derived from volcanic ash or a well-drained histosol are preferred. Its ability to fix nitrogen allows it to grow in very young volcanic soils. Koa and ōhia lehua (Metrosideros polymorpha) dominate the canopy of mixed mesic forests. It is also common in wet forests.

Uses

The koa's trunk was used by ancient Hawaiians to build waa (dugout outrigger canoes) and papa hee nalu (surfboards). Only paipo (bodyboards), kikoo, and alaia surfboards were made from koa, however; olo, the longest surfboards, were made from the lighter and more buoyant wiliwili (Erythrina sandwicensis). The reddish wood is very similar in strength and weight to that of Black Walnut (Juglans nigra), with a specific gravity of 0.55, and is sought for use in wood carving and furniture. Koa is also a tonewood, often used in the construction of ukuleles, acoustic guitars, and Weissenborn-style Hawaiian steel guitars. B.C. Rich used koa on some of their electric guitars as well, and still uses a koa-veneered topwood on certain models. Fender made limited edition koa wood models of the Telecaster and the Stratocaster in 2006. Trey Anastasio, guitarist for the band Phish, primarily uses a koa hollowbody Languedoc guitar. Commercial silviculture of koa takes 20 to 25 years before a tree is of useful size.

Relation to other species
Among other Pacific Islands of volcanic (non-continental) origin, only Vanuatu has native Acacia species. A. heterophylla, from distant Réunion, is very similar and has been suggested to be the closest relative of koa. Genetic sequence analysis results announced in 2014 confirmed this close relationship; the estimated time of divergence is about 1.4 million years ago. A. heterophylla sequences nest within those of the more diverse A. koa, making the latter paraphyletic. Both species are thought to be descended from an ancestral species in Australia, presumably their sister species, Acacia melanoxylon. Dispersals most likely occurred via seed-carrying by birds such as petrels. Both species have very similar ecological niches, which differ from that of A. melanoxylon.

A closely related species, koaia or koaie (A. koaia), is found in dry areas. It is most easily distinguished by having smaller seeds that are arranged end-to-end in the pod, rather than side by side. The phyllodes are also usually straighter, though this character is variable in both species. The wood is denser, harder, and more finely grained than koa wood. Koaia has been much more heavily impacted by cattle and is now rare, but can be seen on ranch land in North Kohala.

Conservation
The koa population has suffered from grazing and logging. Many wet forest areas, where the largest koa grow, have been logged out, and it now comes largely from dead or dying trees or farms on private lands. Although formerly used for outrigger canoes, there are few koa remaining which are both large and straight enough to do so today. In areas where cattle are present, koa regeneration is almost completely suppressed. However, if the cattle are removed, koa are among the few native Hawaiian plants able to germinate in grassland, and can be instrumental in restoring native forest. It is often possible to begin reforestation in a pasture by disk harrowing the soil, as this scarifies seeds in the soil and encourages large numbers of koa to germinate. Experiments at the Hakalau Forest National Wildlife Refuge have shown that ōhia lehua (Metrosideros polymorpha) survives best in pasture when planted under koa. This is because koa trees reduce radiative cooling, preventing frost damage to ōhia lehua seedlings.

Ecology
Koa is the preferred host plant for the caterpillars of the green Hawaiian blue (Udara blackburni), which eat the flowers and fruits. Adults drink nectar from the flowers. Koa sap is eaten by the adult Kamehameha butterfly (Vanessa tameamea). The koa bug (Coleotichus blackburniae) uses its rostrum to suck the contents out of koa seeds. Koa is vulnerable to infection by koa wilt.

Gallery

References

External links

Photos of Acacia koa at Hawaiian Ecosystems at Risk Project (HEAR)
UCLA botanical garden and home
Historic photos and descriptions of Acacia koa

koa
Endemic flora of Hawaii
Trees of Hawaii
Least concern flora of Oceania
Least concern flora of the United States
Plants described in 1854
Taxa named by Asa Gray